Ian Lavery (born 6 January 1963) is a British Labour Party politician who has served as the Member of Parliament (MP) for Wansbeck since 2010. He served as the Chair of the Labour Party under Jeremy Corbyn from 2017 to 2020 and was President of the National Union of Mineworkers (NUM) from 2002 to 2010. He is a member of the Socialist Campaign Group parliamentary caucus.

Early life and education 
Ian Lavery was born on 6 January 1963 in Newcastle upon Tyne to parents John Robert Lavery and his wife, Patricia. After leaving East School, Lavery began a Youth Training Scheme before working in the construction industry. Following a recruitment campaign by the National Coal Board, he started work at the Lynemouth colliery in January 1980. In July 1980, Lavery started a mining craft apprenticeship, transferring to Ellington Colliery in 1981 and attended New College Durham, receiving a Higher National Certificate in mining engineering.

Union and early political career 
In 1986, Lavery was elected onto the National Union of Mineworkers (NUM) committee at Ellington Colliery as compensation secretary. Later, he was voted on to the Northumberland Executive Committee, and then on to the North East Area Executive Committee. He has said that because of his union activity, he was barred by management from completing his Higher National Diploma qualification:
I was the only one in the whole of the North East Area who had completed the HNC who wasn't given that opportunity. I went to see the manager, not that I would have gone by the way, and he said that they didn't think I would be interested. I asked him if he had thought to ask me, and he said no, not really, and he was smiling as he said it.

Lavery became more active in the Labour Party and trade union movement. After serving as first cabinet chair of Wansbeck District Council, Lavery was appointed general secretary of the Northumberland area through the NUM. In 1992, Lavery stood for the national executive committee of the NUM. In the subsequent ballot, he was elected in the first round having gained more than 50% of the vote. When Arthur Scargill stood down as NUM president in August 2002, Lavery was elected unopposed to replace him.

Parliamentary career

First term (2010–2015) 
In February 2010 Lavery became the prospective parliamentary candidate for the Labour Party for Wansbeck. He was elected Member of Parliament (MP) on 6 May 2010 with a majority of 7,031.

He was appointed as Parliamentary Private Secretary to Labour's then deputy leader Harriet Harman, but resigned in 2012 after breaking the party whip by levelling an amendment to exempt prison staff and psychiatric workers from a general public sector increase in the pension age to 68. In December 2012, he said that miners with criminal charges related to the Battle of Orgreave should have them struck. In the same month, he said in Parliament that he had been given a copy of a suicide note written by a constituent who had died by suicide after being told he was no longer eligible for state support.

In March 2014, Lavery posed with one of his sons who had blackened his face to look like Michael Jackson. According to the Daily Mail, some of Lavery's constituents said they found it offensive.

Second term (2015–2017) 
On 8 May 2015, Lavery was re-elected as the MP for Wansbeck with a majority of 10,881. After Ed Miliband resigned as leader of the Labour Party, Lavery was considered a potential candidate from the left wing of the party to run for the leadership. He declined, and supported Andy Burnham in the subsequent leadership election which was won by Jeremy Corbyn. In September 2015, Corbyn appointed him shadow minister for trade unions and civil society.

When Corbyn was challenged by Owen Smith in the 2016 Labour Party leadership election, Lavery supported Corbyn.

In 2016, it was reported that Lavery had received £165,387 from the NUM, the union he had run. A union fund provided him a loan of £72,500 to buy a house in 1994, which was written off in 2003 when Lavery was NUM president. He kept £18,000 returned by an endowment fund he had paid into to repay the cost of the house, and received £89,887.83 in termination payments from the union. He paid back £15,000 of the redundancy payment. Allegations of impropriety were examined by the Trades Union Certification Officer, who in 2017 found that there were no documents detailing the process or decision about Lavery's redundancy, so no investigation followed.

Lavery was appointed as Labour's national campaign co-ordinator, serving jointly with Andrew Gwynne in February 2017.

Third and fourth terms (2017–present) 
In June 2017, Lavery was appointed to the role of chair of the Labour Party. In July 2017, he was criticised for saying that Labour was "too broad a church". In December 2018, Lavery raised in parliament the high insurance premiums of his constituents living near the River Wansbeck in the wake of the 2015–16 Great Britain and Ireland floods. In the same month, he opposed Jeremy Corbyn's move to support a second referendum on Brexit, reportedly saying that if Labour supported a second referendum on the UK's membership of the European Union, the party would lose the next general election.

On 12 December 2019, Lavery held out against a swing to the Conservatives in the North East and was re-elected as the MP for Wansbeck with 17,124 votes and a reduced majority of 814 (2.0%) over Jack Gebhard of the Conservative Party.

In January 2021, Lavery was criticised after he questioned why anyone would have faith in the COVID-19 vaccine and expressed concern about the time it took to approve the vaccine. In a statement, Lavery claimed that his words had been taken out of context.

The Wansbeck Constituency will cease to exist in the coming district redraw, which has its final draft due by July 2023.

On 24 February 2022, following the 2022 Russian invasion of Ukraine, Lavery was one of 11 Labour MPs threatened with losing the party whip after they signed a statement by the Stop the War Coalition which questioned the legitimacy of NATO and accused the military alliance of "eastward expansion". All 11 MPs subsequently removed their signatures.

Personal life
Lavery married Hilary Baird in 1986, aged 23, at the Holy Sepulchre Church in Ashington (known locally as the Miners' Church). The couple have two sons, Ian Junior, born 1988 and Liam, born 1993. Liam is a town councillor for the college ward of Ashington and has been an activist in the Labour Party since his early teens.

Lavery is a trustee of CISWO in the North East area, Northumberland Aged Mineworkers' Homes Association, Woodhorn Colliery Museum and Buzz Learning Disability; he is a patron of Headway for South East Northumberland and Wansbeck Disability Forum. He is also chair and trustee of Pitmen Painters, which reached international acclaim following the release of the West End play of the same name, and which follows a story about the formation of the Northumberland-based organisation.

References

External links 

Official website
 

|-

|-

|-

|-

Living people
1963 births
English miners
English socialists
Labour Party (UK) MPs for English constituencies
People from Ashington
Presidents of the National Union of Mineworkers (Great Britain)
UK MPs 2010–2015
UK MPs 2015–2017
UK MPs 2017–2019
UK MPs 2019–present